The 200 definitive albums in the Rock and Roll Hall of Fame is a 2007 list of the best albums ever produced by artists or bands throughout the history of world music according to the criteria of Rock and Roll Hall of Fame and the National Association of Recording Merchandisers (NARM). Good sales performance and continuity of potential with lasting popularity are adopted as criteria by both.

Table of 200 definitive albums

Artists or bands that appear the most in the ranking

Definitive albums ranked by decade

See also 
 Rock and Roll Hall of Fame Advocate List

References

Rock and Roll Hall of Fame
Albums